William Dougal Christie (5 January 181627 July 1874) was a British diplomat, politician and man of letters.

Life
The son of Dougal Christie, M.D., an officer in the East India Company's medical service, he was born at Bombay on 5 January 1816. He graduated at Trinity College, Cambridge, in 1838, where he was one of the Cambridge Apostles, and was called to the bar in 1840. At this time he was editor of a newspaper, the Kentish Mercury, Gravesend Journal, and Greenwich Gazette, and employed the Chartist Thomas Cooper to edit it. He was also introduced to Thomas Carlyle, perhaps by Albany Fonblanque, and assisted him in the plan for the London Library.

In 1841, Christie was for a short time private secretary to Lord Minto at the admiralty, and from April 1842 to November 1847 represented Weymouth as Member of Parliament. In 1843 he proposed a Bill for removing the religious tests in the old universities; it was quickly defeated. The London Library and the Circulation of French Fiction in the 1840s
 In 1844 he proposed a motion in order to allow presence of "strangers" (journalists) in the House of Commons and the recognition of the right of the journalists to publish reports on the Parliamentary debates. This motion was defeated.

In May 1848 Christie was appointed consul-general in the Mosquito Territory, and from 1851 to 1854 was secretary of legation, frequently acting as chargé d'affaires, to the Swiss Confederation.

In 1854, Christie was made consul-general to the Argentine Republic, and in 1856 minister plenipotentiary. In 1858, he was despatched on a special mission to Paraguay, and in 1859 became envoy extraordinary and minister plenipotentiary to Empire of Brazil. This post involved him in constant difficulties with the Brazilian government, partly arising from his efforts to enforce the treaties relating to the slave trade, and partly from claims for compensation on the part of British subjects. Christie's position wasn't helped by a quarrel at cards with James Watson Webb, the American ambassador, at the Russian embassy.

The situation came to a head in 1863 when Christie sent an ultimatum for reparations for two minor incidents at the end of 1861 and beginning of 1862. The Brazilian government refused to yield, and Christie issued orders for British warships to capture Brazilian merchant vessels as indemnity. While Christie had been instructed to accept a Brazilian offer of arbitration if it was made, he was later accused of not informing the Brazilian government of this until after military action had been taken; he had indicated he wanted to teach Brazil a "lesson". Brazil prepared itself for the imminent conflict. The Brazilian government severed diplomatic ties with Britain in June and Christie retired from the service on a pension. The House of Commons debated his conduct, with some MPs like Seymour Vesey-FitzGerald criticising him for taking disproportionate action, to teach Brazil a "lesson".

Christie returned to an old topic, campaigning against electoral corruption. He read a paper on the subject to the National Association for the Promotion of Social Science in February 1864. Later in the year F. D. Maurice praised it in Macmillan's Magazine. He then made two unsuccessful attempts to re-enter parliament, at Cambridge in 1865 and Greenock in 1868. After a serious illness, he died in Marylebone on 27 July 1874.

Works
In 1839 he produced a work advocating the secret ballot, republished with additions in 1872 as The Ballot, and Corruption and Expenditure at Elections. In the Introductory Note on the ballot he sketched the earlier parliamentary history from his own perspective: George Grote had introduced a motion on it in 1833, and up to 1839 there had been increasing support, with Thomas Babington Macaulay arguing on its side. Henry George Ward took up the cause in 1842, when Grote no longer was an MP. James Mill and Fonblanque were supporters in print; William Empson and John Allen were encouraging about the initial essay of 1839. Only Sydney Smith's witty barbs are mentioned on the other side of the argument.

Christie revisited his diplomatic career in Notes on Brazilian Questions (1865). In retirement he concentrated on the history and literature of the seventeenth century. He had in 1859 edited a volume of original documents illustrating the life of Anthony Ashley Cooper, 1st Earl of Shaftesbury up to 1660, and in 1871 he published a complete if partisan biography, largely based on the posthumous papers of Shaftesbury and John Locke, and other manuscripts. He wrote a memoir of John Dryden, prefixed to his edition published in the Globe series (1870). In 1874 Christie edited the correspondence of Sir Joseph Williamson, Charles II's secretary of state, for the Camden Society.

Christie became involved in a personal controversy with Abraham Hayward, who had attacked the memory of John Stuart Mill; it included a now-mysterious incident in the whist room of the Athenaeum Club in May 1873. Christie wrote to vindicate Mill, who had contacted him in 1867 over the secret ballot; the debate was cut short by his death.

Family
He married Mary Grant, a neighbour and friend of Anthony Trollope, and the eldest daughter of Colonel (later Major-General) James Grant, CB. They had at least 3 sons and 3 daughters, including the novelist Mary Elizabeth Christie (1847–1906).

Notes

References

External links
WorldCat page

1816 births
1874 deaths
British diplomats
British biographers
Members of the Parliament of the United Kingdom for English constituencies
Politicians from Mumbai
UK MPs 1841–1847